This article lists the squads for the 2014 AFC Women's Asian Cup, the 18th edition of the AFC Women's Asian Cup. The tournament is a quadrennial women's international football tournament for national teams in Asia organised by the Asian Football Confederation (AFC), and was held in Vietnam from 14 to 25 May 2014. In the tournament there were involved eight national teams. Each national team registered a final squad of 23 players, with the option of submitting a preliminary squad of 18–50 players. Following an amendment to regulations, the AFC permitted nations to register 25 players for the final squad.

The age listed for each player is on 14 May 2014, the first day of the tournament. The numbers of caps and goals listed for each player do not include any matches played after the start of tournament. The club listed is the club for which the player last played a competitive match prior to the tournament. The nationality for each club reflects the national association (not the league) to which the club is affiliated. A flag is included for coaches that are of a different nationality than their own national team.

Group A

Australia
The 23-player squad was announced on 6 May. On 12 May, Emma Checker and Amy Harrison were added to the squad.

Head coach: Alen Stajcic

Japan
The 23-player squad was announced on 2 May. A day later, Michi Goto and Ami Sugita were added to the squad. On 8 May, Kana Osafune withdrew due to injury and was replaced by Yuria Obara.

Head coach: Norio Sasaki

Jordan
The 23-player squad was announced on 5 May 2014.

Head coach:  Masahiko Okiyama

Vietnam
Head coach:  Chen Yunfa

Group B

China
Head coach: Hao Wei

Myanmar
Head coach: Myat Myat Oo

South Korea
The 23-player squad was announced on 15 April.

Head coach: Yoon Deok-yeo

Thailand
The 25-player squad was announced on 8 May.

Head coach: Nuengruethai Sathongwien

References

squads
2014